The Tigers of Mompracem (Italian: Le tigri di Mompracem) is a 1970 Italian-Spanish historical adventure film directed by Mario Sequi and starring Ivan Rassimov, Claudia Gravy and Andrea Bosic. It is an adaptation of the 1900 novel of the same name by Emilio Salgari featuring his hero, the Malayan pirate Sandokan.

The film's sets were designed by the art directors José Luis Galicia and Jaime Pérez Cubero.

Cast

References

Bibliography 
 Goble, Alan. The Complete Index to Literary Sources in Film. Walter de Gruyter, 1999.

External links 
 

1970 films
Italian historical adventure films
1970s historical adventure films
Spanish historical adventure films
1970s Italian-language films
Films directed by Mario Sequi
Films set in the 19th century
Titanus films
Films based on the Indo-Malaysian cycle
1970s Italian films